Rob McLennan  (born 1970) is a Canadian writer, critic, and publisher.

McLennan is the author of two novels, and more than twenty books of poems, stories and essays published in Canada, the United States, England, Ireland, and Japan. He has been called "arguably his generation's finest practitioner" and his writing has garnered significant critical recognition, including the CAA / Air Canada Award as the "most-promising writer under 30 in Canada", the John Newlove Poetry Award, the Mid-Career Artist Award from the Ottawa Arts Council, and being twice long-listed for the CBC Poetry Prize, in 2012 and 2017. He is notable as an interviewer of other poets, with his "12-20 Questions" interviews appearing on his own blog, and in such publications as Ploughshares.  

McLennan's books have been published by Talonbooks, The Mercury Press, Black Moss Press, New Star Books, Insomniac Press, Broken Jaw Press, Stride, Salmon Publishing and others. His writing style is sometimes experimental and is noted for its use of humour and the element of surprise.

In his capacity as a publisher, McLennan operates above/ground press, a chapbook press that has operated since 1993 as an eclectic disseminator of new, especially experimental poetry within the North American poetry community.

References 

1970 births
Living people
21st-century Canadian poets
21st-century Canadian novelists
Canadian male poets
Canadian male novelists
Canadian publishers (people)
21st-century Canadian male writers
People from the United Counties of Stormont, Dundas and Glengarry
Writers from Ontario